Daniel Smales (born 21 October 1990 in Kingston upon Hull) is an English actor. His work includes a range of stage and film.

Career
Smales auditioned and gained a place to study Musical Theatre at Trinity Laban Conservatoire of Music and Dance. He was also accepted into Royal Academy of Music, but was forced to turn his place down due to not being able to fund his place. Following that decision, he embarked on his passion for film.

His first film role was for Death Walks (2016) independent film developed by first-time writer and director Spencer Hawken. He auditioned for the role of “Steve”, the shop assistant, alongside love interest "Louise" (Lucinda Rhodes).

Smales appeared in the Hyundai commercial (2018). Smales also appeared in Gogodoc commercial (2018).

He played the character of “Kevin” a journalist in No Reasons (2021). One review of the film compliments "an admirably creepy performance by Daniel Smales". In an interview with Hull Daily Mail, Smales shared how the character was based on an old school teacher. Expressing that the characteristics of the slicked hair, jackets and pointed shoes the character wears inspired the characteristics in the film. In an interview with Nerdly, Smales revealed he didn't sleep for the first night after reading the original script, debating whether this role was right for him. In the same interview Spencer Hawken revealed Smales had designed the artwork for the release of the film.

Smales was in Hull's Cool List 2021.

Personal
Smales was born in Kingston upon Hull in East Yorkshire, where he grew up on the Orchard Park Estate. He is the son of Anthony Smales and Margaret Smales. He has an older sister and an older brother. He attended the local Shaw Park Primary School, along with the local secondary school Sir Henry Cooper School. He attended Wyke Sixth Form College where he studied performing arts and information technology.  Smales took a year at Hull College studying musical theatre. He left Hull to pursue his career in London. Smales is known to have Dyslexia.

Charity
Smales is an advocate for Alzheimer’s supporting the charities Alzheimer’s Research UK and Alzheimer’s Society. Smales father died of Alzheimer's disease in December 2021. In an interview with Hull Live Smales paid tribute to his 'selfless and caring' dad Tony, and believes Investment in dementia research remains low compared to other major health conditions across the United Kingdom.

Credits

Film

Stage

Commercial

References

External links 

1990 births
Living people
21st-century English male actors
Actors from Yorkshire
Male actors from Kingston upon Hull
Male actors from Yorkshire
English male actors
English male film actors